Hai Karate was a budget aftershave and cologne for men that was sold in the United States and the United Kingdom from the 1960s through to the 1980s. It was reintroduced in the United Kingdom under official license in late 2014.

History
The fragrance was originally developed by the Leeming division of Pfizer and launched in 1967 with the catchphrase "Be careful how you use it." In terms of pricing, Hai Karate was positioned higher than Old Spice, Aqua Velva, and Mennen Skin Bracer; and lower than the more expensive Jade East and English Leather. As well as the original Hai Karate fragrance, other versions named Oriental Lime and Oriental Spice were soon introduced. 
Hai Karate was reintroduced in the UK in 2014 by Healthpoint Ltd, following the brand's original formulation, using a different bottle packaging.

Marketing
Hai Karate was known for its amusing television adverts, and magazine ads, which included self-defense instructions to help wearers "fend off women" (a theme also used in TV commercials). The brand's marketing plan was developed at the advertising firm of McCaffrey & McCall by George Newall, who would later gain fame as the songwriter and creative force behind Schoolhouse Rock!

The advertisements were considered humorous as they played to a “...male fantasy of a world where women find them irresistible.” The approach supported the Freudian theory that humor can sometimes be obtained by imagining a fantasy where one achieves what would otherwise be unattainable:  in this case,  a mild-mannered, bookish man, becoming the object of attention by a world of women.

For Hai Karate, the humor unfolded on three levels.  First, was the notion that wearing a certain aftershave would somehow make a man irresistible to women.  Second, the male involved in the advertisements was presented as an everyman providing amusing contrast with the exceptionally attractive women who suddenly find him irresistible.  Third, was the concept of having to read a set of karate instructions included with the aftershave and the humorous thought of defending oneself from a crowds of women using karate.

Among the women aggressively pursuing the male in some of the television ads, was British starlet Valerie Leon.

Although extremely popular at the time the ads were introduced, in the decades following, a similar advertisement theme of men fighting off women would have tended to be thought unacceptable. Notwithstanding, Hai Karate made an appearance in the 2004 movie The Incredibles. Reviewers believed the product placement was a wink at older moviegoers by writer and director Brad Bird who was born in 1957. Moreover, the manufacturers of UK male fragrance spray Lynx made a series of TV adverts on the same theme over a period of two decades, making the product famous in British popular culture.

References

Further reading
 Tuckwood, Jan. "Uncorked Machismo!", The Palm Beach Post (June 2001)

External links
 Hai Karate Aftershave Hai Karate official website
 Hai Karate Basenotes fragrance directory

Personal care brands
Perfumes
Products introduced in 1967